A Great Artist is the second studio album by American metalcore band A Life Once Lost. Originally released on June 17, 2003, by Ferret Music, it was reissued on LP in 2004 by Deathwish.

Track listing

Personnel
Jacob Bannon – Design, Illustrations
Robert Meadows -vocals
Robert Carpenter - guitars
Douglas Sabolick - Guitars, Backing Vocals
Nick Frasca – Bass
Justin Graves – Drums
Andrew Frankle – Engineer
Eric Rachel – Mixing
Alan Douches – Mastering

References

2003 albums
A Life Once Lost albums
Albums with cover art by Jacob Bannon
Deathwish Inc. albums
Ferret Music albums